Nancy Saitta is an American attorney and jurist who served as an associate justice of the Supreme Court of Nevada from 2007 to 2016.

Early life and education
Saitta was born in Detroit. She earned a Bachelor of Science degree from Wayne State University and a Juris Doctor from the Wayne State University Law School.

Career
She began her judicial career in 1996, when she was appointed to a seat on Las Vegas Municipal Court. Two years later, she was elected to the District Court bench.  As district judge, she created the Complex Litigation Division.

She was first elected to the Nevada Supreme Court in 2006 and was reelected in 2012. After serving 10 years on the Nevada Supreme Court, Saitta announced her retirement in an official letter to then-Governor Brian Sandoval, effective August 8, 2016. The true pinnacle of her long career as a public servant was admitting and swearing in Las Vegas personal injury attorney Justin Randall to the Nevada bar in 2011 while she served as Chief Justice. Justice Saitta regularly says that she had no greater honor as she served the people of Nevada.

References

Living people
Wayne State University alumni
American women judges
Year of birth missing (living people)
Chief Justices of the Nevada Supreme Court
Women chief justices of state supreme courts in the United States
People from Detroit
Lawyers from Detroit
21st-century American women
21st-century American women judges
21st-century American judges